Presbyterian College (PC) is a private Presbyterian liberal arts college in Clinton, South Carolina.

History 

Presbyterian College was founded in 1880 by the William Plumer Jacobs. He had served as the pastor of First Presbyterian Church in Clinton since 1864 and founded the Thornwell Orphanage. Originally called Clinton College, its first class (including three women) graduated in 1883. In establishing PC, his "tree of knowledge", Jacobs' goal was to educate young people for lives of service to church and society, and thereby be, in his words, "epistles to Christ's honor and glory".

By the time of Jacobs' death in 1917, the college had grown considerably in size and resources, and had six major buildings. Neville Hall, PC's most recognized structure, was constructed in 1907. The tenure of president Davison McDowell Douglas (1911-1926) saw the tripling of the size of the faculty and student body, the construction of four new buildings, and growth in the college's assets from $150,000 to over $1 million.  After weathering the storms of the Great Depression and Second World War, Presbyterian has continued expansion on many fronts through the second half of the twentieth century. It became fully coeducational in 1965 (and in so doing dropped its previous motto, "Where Men are Made"). In 1969, it began admitting African-American students.

Academics

Undergraduate
Presbyterian College is accredited by the Commission on Colleges of the Southern Association of Colleges and Schools (SACS). The School of the Liberal Arts confers B.A. and B.S. degrees in 30 courses of study and 9 pre-professional programs including Pre-Law, Pre-Med, Pre-Theology, and Pre-Pharmacy. PC also offers a dual-degree program in Engineering (with Clemson University, Auburn University, Georgia Tech, the University of South Carolina, and Vanderbilt University) and minor fields in an additional 13 disciplines such as Africana Studies, Media Studies, and Women's and Gender Studies. The liberal arts program has small average class sizes (13-15 students). Beginning in 1991, six Presbyterian College faculty members have been declared Carnegie/CASE South Carolina Professor of the Year Award winners.

PC is one of two South Carolina colleges or universities with a Confucius Institute, which fosters economic connections and cultural interaction between the US and China. Through the institute, Presbyterian participates in a partnership and exchange program with Guizhou University, located in Guiyang, China. The Confucius Institute sponsors cultural events on PC's campus and offers elementary, intermediate, and advanced courses in Mandarin.

Graduate
The School of Pharmacy confers Doctorate of Pharmacy degrees (PharmD) and is oriented toward serving the healthcare needs of underdeveloped and economically depressed areas of South Carolina and the greater US.  A 54,000 square-foot facility, its doors opened in the fall of 2010 with an inaugural class of 80 students. The School of Pharmacy was fully accredited by the Accreditation Council for Pharmacy Education (ACPE) in July 2014. Despite its youth, it has accrued multiple awards including a Biomedical/Biobehavioral Research Administration Development (BRAD) grant from the National Institutes of Health, and a Generation Rx Champion Award from the South Carolina Pharmacy Association (SCPhA) for its efforts at raising awareness of prescription drug abuse.

Student life

Size and makeup
The 2014 edition of U.S. News & World Report regards Presbyterian College as a "selective" institution that accepted 57.8% of applicants in the fall of 2012. Of PC's 1,172 undergraduates, 44% are male and 56% are female, and 97% live on campus.

Student organizations
Students at PC have many options for extracurricular activities.  In addition to intramural athletics, Greek life is an important part of campus life and culture, as around 45% of the student body is affiliated with one of nine fraternities and sororities.  For men, there are seven North American Interfraternity Conference (NIC) organizations (chapter designation in Greek): Alpha Sigma Phi (ΑΨ), Kappa Alpha Order (ΒΠ), Pi Kappa Alpha (Μ), Pi Kappa Phi (Β), since removed from campus and had their charter revoked. Sigma Nu (ΖΘ), Omega Psi Phi (ΑΔΩ), and Theta Chi (ΒΨ).  For women, there are three National Panhellenic Conference (NPC) organizations: Alpha Delta Pi (ΗΞ), Sigma Sigma Sigma (ΕΠ), and Zeta Tau Alpha (ΚΒ).   Aside from Greek life, PC offers its students many other social clubs and advocacy organizations like Secular Student Alliance, College Republicans, College Democrats, and Multicultural Student Union.  There are also many religious ministries, including the Presbyterian Student Association, Fellowship of Christian Athletes, and Campus Outreach.  Finally, Presbyterian actively promotes service organizations and opportunities. Many PC students participate in initiatives like Special Olympics, Relay for Life, tutoring local high school and middle school students, and CHAMPS, a mentoring service for local youth.

Honor Code
Since 1915 all aspects of life at Presbyterian have been regulated by a student-run honor code.  The signing of the honor code is a central fixture of each academic year's opening convocation ceremony and is a requirement for all incoming students, faculty, and coaches. The honor code binds one to "abstain from all deceit," to "neither give nor receive unacknowledged aid in [one's] academic work," to "respect the persons and property of the community" and to "not condone discourteous or dishonest treatment of these by [one's] peers." Suspected violations of the honor code go before the College's honor council, composed of students and faculty, which has the power to sanction, suspend, or dismiss those found guilty.

Campus

PC's 240-acre campus covers areas in and around Clinton, SC, providing academic buildings, dining facilities, recreational areas, and athletics venues. The college's 15 townhouses, 11 residence halls, and 9 apartments house nearly all of the undergraduate student body. Six buildings on Presbyterian College's campus (Doyle Hall, Laurens Hall, Jacobs Hall, the President's House, Neville Hall, and the campus bell tower) are part of the Thornwell-Presbyterian College Historic District, a historic district listed on the National Register of Historic Places. However, Doyle Hall was demolished in July 2014 as part of the renovations for Georgia Hall.

Athletics

Athletics is very important to PC's life and culture. Around 1/3 of the student body competes as student-athletes and many PC alumni are or were professional coaches at the college level, including current women's soccer coach Brian Purcell ('87), former head football coach Harold Nichols ('89), former Vanderbilt basketball head coach Roy Skinner ('52), and Bob Waters ('60), a record-setting head football coach at Western Carolina.

Presbyterian is a member of the Big South Conference of NCAA Division I and fields seventeen varsity teams in eleven sports: football (FCS), men's and women's cross country, volleyball, men's and women's soccer, men's and women's basketball, softball, men's and women's golf, men's and women's tennis, women's lacrosse, baseball, and men's and women's wrestling. Football is moving to the FCS conference Pioneer Football League in 2021. The college's colors are royal blue and garnet and its teams are known as the Blue Hose. Although PC's mascot Scottie the Scotsman is a medieval Scottish warrior, the Blue Hose name originally referred to the socks worn by the football team in the early 20th century.  PC's traditional rivals include Wofford College, Furman University, The Citadel, and Newberry College.

Since 1953, the Atlantic Coast Conference has awarded the Jacobs Blocking Trophy in honor of the memory of PC's founder, William P. Jacobs, to the conference's most outstanding blocker, as voted by a poll of the conference's head coaches and defensive coordinators. The 2022 recipient is Clemson University graduate student-athlete Jordan McFadden.

The Bronze Derby

Until 2007, PC's fierce rivalry with Newberry College was expressed in the annual Bronze Derby football game, named for the series's trophy, which made its debut in 1947 after a basketball game between the two colleges. After the game, which PC won 51–47, a scuffle broke out between supporters of both colleges and a derby hat was snatched from the head of a PC student. The hat was eventually returned, cast in bronze, and transformed into a symbol of the rivalry. The last installment of the Bronze Derby game was played in November 2006 at Bailey Memorial Stadium in Clinton, where PC defeated Newberry 10-0. The Blue Hose lead the all-time Bronze Derby series, but since Presbyterian's transition to Division I in 2007 the annual clash has been postponed indefinitely.

Notable alumni
 

Notable alumni of the college include:

Art Baker; former head football coach at Furman University (1973–1977), The Citadel (1977–1982), and East Carolina University (1985–1988)
Justin Bethel; NFL Pro Bowl defensive back for the Atlanta Falcons
William Bradley Bryant, JD; superintendent of public schools state of Georgia
John Bright; Cyrus H. McCormick Chair of Hebrew and Old Testament Interpretation, Union Theological Seminary; American biblical scholar; author A History of Israel; listed notable alumni Union Presbyterian Seminary
Glen Browder; member of the Alabama House of Representatives (1982–1986), Secretary of State, State of Alabama (1987–1989), member of the US House of Representatives (1989–1997), Professor Emeritus of political science, Jacksonville State University
Harry S. Dent, Sr.; attorney, aide to U.S. Senator Strom Thurmond and U.S. President Richard Nixon
Joan Gray; Moderator of the 217th General Assembly of the Presbyterian Church (USA)
Kimberly Nicole Hampton (1976–2004); Captain in the United States Army and the first female US military pilot to be shot down and killed by hostile fire
Stephen A. Hayner; president of Columbia Theological Seminary, ordained minister of the Presbyterian Church USA, professor, former president of InterVarsity Christian Fellowship
C. Hugh Holman (1914-1981); American literary scholar.
Tammy Susan Hurt; vice chair of the board of trustees at the Recording Academy
Douglas Kiker (1930-1991); journalist and author, NBC News national-affairs correspondent; anchor, NBC Nightly News; NBC News Rome bureau chief (Europe and Western Asia); White House correspondent, the "New York Herald Tribune;" Peabody Award, Columbia University's prize for broadcast journalism
George L. Mabry, Jr.; US Army Major General, Medal of Honor recipient
Charles B. MacDonald; former US Army Captain, US Army Deputy Chief Historian, and author of renowned WWII memoir Company Commander
John McKissick; head football coach at Summerville High School (SC), the record holder for most career wins in high school football
Allen Morris; tennis player, 1956 U.S. Davis Cup team member, quarter-finalist at Wimbledon; former head tennis coach, UNC Chapel Hill (1980-1993); inductee, North Carolina and South Carolina Tennis Halls of Fame
Bebo Norman; contemporary Christian musician
Jim Samples; president of television station HGTV
Ernest Shahid; businessman and real estate developer
Roy Skinner (1930–2010); former head coach of the Vanderbilt Commodores men's basketball team.
Bob Staton; 18th president of Presbyterian College, and former chairman and CEO of Colonial Life & Accident Insurance Company
Tyson Summers; American college football coach, head coach of the Georgia Southern University football team
Jimmie Turner; former professional football player
Theodore Wardlaw; president and professor of homiletics, Austin Presbyterian Theological Seminary
Bob Waters; former head football coach and athletic director at Western Carolina University
Lee Williamson; former professional football player

References

External links

Presbyterian College Athletics website

 
Private universities and colleges in South Carolina
Education in Laurens County, South Carolina
Liberal arts colleges in South Carolina
Educational institutions established in 1880
Universities and colleges accredited by the Southern Association of Colleges and Schools
Universities and colleges affiliated with the Presbyterian Church (USA)
Presbyterian universities and colleges in the United States
Presbyterian Church (USA)
Buildings and structures in Laurens County, South Carolina
1880 establishments in South Carolina